Nice View may refer to:

 Nice View (album), a 1993 album
 Nice View (film), a 2022 film